Daniel Azor Leo (born 2 October 1982) is a rugby union player. He can play in the second row or as a back row forward.

Early life
Leo was born in Palmerston North, New Zealand and moved to Australia when he was 18. He played for Sunnybank in the Queensland Competition, as well as the Queensland Reds.

Club career
After making his debut for Samoa in 2005, he was not eligible to play for an Australian Super 12 franchise, so moved to London Wasps. He was a replacement as Wasps won the 2007 Heineken Cup Final.

He later had spells with Bordeaux Begles and USA Perpignan in the Top 14, and London Irish in the Aviva Premiership.

On 21 May 2015, Leo signed for London Welsh for the 2015-16 RFU Championship season. He moved to London Cornish for 2016-17 as Player/Coach in London 2 South-West, where he helped the club to the title in an unbeaten season. In 2017-18 he moved to Bishops Stortford RFC in National League 1, before returning to London Cornish for the 2018-19 season.

International career
Leo made his international debut for Samoa at the Telstra Stadium in Sydney against Australia in June 2005. He was included in the Pacific Islanders squad that toured Europe in late 2006. He was also selected in the Samoa squad for the 2007 Rugby World Cup and the 2011 Rugby World Cup. He went on to represent Samoa 39 times, and retired from international rugby on 28 May 2015, just 4 months before the 2015 Rugby World Cup.

References

External links
London Welsh Profile

1982 births
Samoan rugby union players
Living people
New Zealand sportspeople of Samoan descent
Wasps RFC players
Union Bordeaux Bègles players
USA Perpignan players
London Irish players
London Welsh RFC players
Samoa international rugby union players
Pacific Islanders rugby union players
Samoan expatriate rugby union players
Expatriate rugby union players in England
Expatriate rugby union players in France
Expatriate rugby union players in Australia
Samoan expatriate sportspeople in England
Samoan expatriate sportspeople in France
Samoan expatriate sportspeople in Australia
Rugby union players from Palmerston North
People educated at Auckland Grammar School
Rugby union locks